Darren John Boyd (born 30 January 1971) is a British actor who starred in the Sky 1 series Spy, for which he won a BAFTA Award. His work in television and film spans comedy and drama.

Early life
Boyd began acting at age 17 in amateur theatre and performed in local productions from 1989 to 1995. Boyd moved to London in his mid-20s, where he continued to work in theatre until being cast in Kiss Me Kate for the BBC in 1998.

Career

Television
Boyd co-starred in the BBC comedy Kiss Me Kate (1998), which ran for three years. This led to starring roles in British comedies such as Hippies (1999) and Smack the Pony (1999). In 2001, he worked with Victoria Pile on a new series Los Dos Bros, an off-beat sitcom exploring physical comedy and the relationship between Boyd and Cavan Clerkin as the titular (half-)brothers. Boyd was co-creator and co-writer. The show won a silver rose at Montreux in 2002. During this time Boyd was cast in the American NBC series, Watching Ellie, starring Julia Louis-Dreyfus.

Boyd returned to the UK in 2005 and took on characters such as Dr. Jake Leaf in the second series of Green Wing (2006), and as Jonathan in Steve Coogan's Saxondale. In 2009, he appeared in the two-part adaptation of May Contain Nuts, based on John O'Farrell's best-selling novel, Personal Affairs for BBC Three and Royal Wedding (2010), which follows the 1981 Royal Wedding through the perspective of events held in a small Welsh mining village, written by BAFTA winner Abi Morgan and starring Jodie Whittaker.

Boyd starred as Bib in the BBC series Whites and co-starred in the BBC Four drama Dirk Gently playing Dirk Gently's business partner Richard MacDuff. The BBC announced in June 2011 that Boyd would play the role of John Cleese in Holy Flying Circus, a 90-minute dramatisation of the controversy that arose when Monty Python's Life of Brian was released in 1979. Holy Flying Circus was nominated for the British Academy Television Award for Best Single Drama.

From 2011–2013, Boyd starred in the Sky 1 series Spy which won him a BAFTA for his performance. He also starred in two ITV dramas, Case Sensitive, a series adapted from Sophie Hannah's novel Point of Rescue alongside Olivia Williams and three-part drama The Guilty.

In 2014, Boyd was reunited with his Watching Ellie costar Julia Louis-Dreyfus in a guest appearance on her HBO series Veep in the episode "Special Relationship".

Boyd was part of the ensemble cast of Sky Atlantic drama series Fortitude, which premiered simultaneously in the UK and US in early 2015 playing Markus Huseklepp. Following Fortitude, Boyd briefly returned to comedy in the lead role of Matthew Bunting in the ITV situation comedy The Delivery Man.

In 2016, he returned to television with two dramatic roles. He appeared opposite Idris Elba in the fourth series of Luther for the BBC and James Nesbitt in Stan Lee's Lucky Man, a Sky 1 television series.

In early 2018, Boyd played Frank Haleton in the British BBC drama series Killing Eve.

In late 2019, Boyd provided the voice of Mr. Brown in The Adventures of Paddington which began airing on Nick Jr. in early 2020.

He played Supt. Dave Minty in the 2020 BBC drama, The Salisbury Poisonings.

Notable cameos include an evangelical vicar in Rev. and an ex-athlete named Dave Wellbeck in BBC's Olympics mockumentary Twenty Twelve.

Film
Feature films in which Boyd has appeared include High Heels and Low Lifes (2002), Imagine Me & You (2005),  Magicians (2007), Chris Morris' Four Lions (2010), The World's End (2013), Alan Partridge: Alpha Papa (2013), Thomas & Friends: Journey Beyond Sodor (2017) and The Personal History of David Copperfield (2019).

Radio
Boyd starred as a reluctant arms dealer in the BBC Radio 4 sitcom Safety Catch. He also co-starred in ElvenQuest, another Radio 4 sitcom, as Vidar the Elf Lord.  In 2018, he appeared as a major suspect in the  Radio 4 drama, A Small Town Murder.

Personal life
Boyd lives in London.

Filmography

Film

Television

Awards and recognition
 Los Dos Bros was winner of a Silver Rose for Best Sitcom at the Montreux Festival in 2002.
 Boyd won the Best TV Comedy Actor award at The British Comedy Awards in 2011.
 Nominated for Best Actor in a comedy at the Royal Television Society Awards, 2012.
 Boyd won the British Academy Television Award for Best Male Comedy Performance in 2012.

References

External links

1971 births
Living people
20th-century English male actors
20th-century English singers
21st-century English male actors
21st-century English singers
Best Male Comedy Performance BAFTA Award (television) winners
English male film actors
English male singers
English male television actors
Male actors from Sussex
People from Hastings